"Pop That Coochie" ("Pop That Pussy" on the album) is a song by American hip hop group 2 Live Crew. It was released on August 30, 1991 as the lead single from their album Sports Weekend: As Nasty as They Wanna Be, Pt. 2. The song reached number 58 on the U.S. Billboard Hot 100 and peaked at number 33 in New Zealand.

Charts

References

External links
   

1991 singles
2 Live Crew songs
Dirty rap songs
Luke Records singles
1991 songs